Emmanuel Eni AKA Blackman in European Kitchen (born 1967), is a Nigerian-born German artist and poet. He is known as a painter, sculptor, multimedia artist, and performance artist. He is also known as "Blackman in European Kitchen". Eni is considered one of the outstanding contemporary artists in Africa and the western world.

Biography 
Emmanuel Eni was born in 1967 in Igbanke, Nigeria. He studied art at Igbobi College in Lagos; the Polytechnic University of Auchi; and at the University of Benin.

Internationally, Eni exhibited at the Biennale d'art contemporain de Lyon, the Biennale in Dakar (Dak'Art)[1] and parallel at the documenta 12 in Kassel. He also works as a lecturer in private and public institutions.

He is the inventor and patent holder of New LightPaintings Art, the philosopher of the thesis of "contemporary barock art" - the union of all aspects of art. He is writer and performer of "Blackman in European Kitchen" and is also known as the "sculptor of elephants", and the Father of 100 Elephants.

Eni creates sculptures in bronze and terracotta. In recent times it has focused on the use of recycled and commonly used materials. A famous work was “Elephant”. For the artist, the elephant represents the mother of all animals and the largest land mammal. Eni claims that without elephants, nature will no longer exist. The sculpture monument received a lot of public attention because of its shape, great size and weight of 20 tons and its color. The sculpture was made of re-enforced concrete. The elephant of the colour of earth tones, like just emerged from a mud bath.

After the exhibition, the 20-ton sculpture was to be handed over to a sculpture park that was yet to be established. Since this was not created and no other use could be found, Eni destroyed the monument in front of live performance of 3000 people. As an ecological statement on the dangers and threat of extinction of the animal nature. The performance intervention he titled "Junking of the Elephant" took place on September 23, 2006.

Exhibitions 
"Hope of Love" paintings and sculptures Germany, "THE BOOM" exhibition of new light painting art and sculptures
 "Brightness of the picture" - sculptures and paintings, Schwarzenbach an der Saale, Bavaria, Germany
 "Haske Zanen" - sculptures, paintings and performance with new light, painting, art
 Thought pyramid Gallery Abuja / German Embassy Abuja Nigeria
 "Art Merchant“ - sculptures and paintings, National museum Lagos, Nigeria
 Diverse lecture activities in sculpture, installation, audiovisual performance and literature
 "Leaf spirit totem" - 7 m high sculpture for Syke, Bremen Germany (Wood, Terra Kota, Mirror glass, 2011)
 "Blackman in European Kitchen", ICD Institute for cultural diplomacy, Berlin, Germany
 "Ear as a long road" - poetic performance, Berlin, Poetry Festival Lyricline
 "Consciences and frontiers" installation "Israel and Palestine" and "Knowledge is power" - SAVVY Contemporary, Berlin, Germany
 Exhibition / performance Israel and Palestine "Schlachtfelder" - Battlefields Anniversary of 250 years battle - city of Minden, Germany
 "Black History month" - Africa reflection - sculptures and paintings, America Haus, Berlin, Germany
 "2nd African Legends Performance" poetic musical dance performance, America Haus, Berlin, Germany
 ARESUVA - African regional summit for visual arts, Abuja, Nigeria
 Visiting professor new media/performance - Art University Berlin Weißensee. Kunsthochschule Berlin - Weißensee Berlin, Germany
 "Africanize" installation - Grassimuseum Grassi Museum, Saxony Ethnographic collection, Leipzig, Germany
 "Africanize" installation kunstbanken hamar Hamar, Norway
 "Blackman in European Kitchen" - installation/performance, Goethe-Institute, Lagos, Nigeria
 "CharacterLAGOStika", Goethe-Institut Nigeria, Lagos, Nigeria
 "Death of the curator" installation/performance, documenta 12, Kassel, Germany
 "CrossCulture" installation/performance - Goethe-Institut Senegal, Dakar, Senegal
 Publication "Death of the curator" drama. E.N.I Publishers, Berlin
 Group Show "Black Paris" African position on contemporary art of Diaspora. Paris France, Iwalewahaus, Bayreuth, Germany
 "Blackman in European Kitchen" - performance Iwalewahaus, Bayreuth, Germany
 "Israel and Palestine" installation/performance Dak'Art 2006 Biennial of Contemporary African Art, Dakar, Senegal
 "Junking of the Elephant" – destruction of a 20-ton heavy "Elephant" Monument of re-enforced Steel Concrete - Before a live Audience. For the Ecology and nature
 "Death of the curator" installation/performance, Grassi museum Leipzig, Saxony Ethnographic collection, Germany
 Guest professor sculpture - rhode island school of design (risd) (RISD), USA
 Publication "Masquaradeundressing" (poems, tales and stories), CPN publishers, England
 "Water Burns" - exhibition/installation on "Water Uses" in the New Millennium Vienna, Austria
 "History of love" - sculptures and paintings. Galerie im Prater, Berlin, Germany
 Making of "Elephant" (20 ton monument for nature) und Making of "Leaf“ (7 meters high monument for nature) steel concrete
 "Characteristics of living things", Archäologisches Museum Colombischlössle Archeology museum of Castle Colombi, Freiburg im Breisgau, Germany
 "Parts of Clay" - Centre Monroe for the Arts, Hoboken, New Jersey, USA
 "Clear Walls" - Lisa Parker Fine Art New York, USA
 "Parables" - National museum, Lagos, Nigeria
 "Creation Story" - Albertus - Magnus - Haus, Freiburg im Breisgau, Germany
 Drawing School, University of Lagos, Nigeria.

Bibliography 
 Emmanuel Eni: Death of the curator. Berlin 2007.
 Emmanuel Eni: Elephants and new – light paintings (Ausstellung vom 19. August bis 9. Oktober 2011, Galerie Schwartzsche Villa, Hrsg.: Bezirksamt Steglitz-Zehlendorf, Kulturamt. Projektmitarbeiter: Anja Braun, Stefan Martinkat) 
 Emmanuel Eni: The Art of Blackman in European Kitchen. 2017.
"Kindonkind"- Poetry anthology. 321 pages of 600 poems published in Germany 2021

References

External links 

 Death of the Curator-Kunstinstallation im Leipzig Museum of Ethnography (German)
 Blackman in European Kitchen - public figure on Facebook

1967 births
Living people
Nigerian painters
Nigerian sculptors